Ortenberg is a mountain of Baden-Württemberg, Germany. It lies on the southwest of the Swabian Jura, on the southern slope of the Upper Schlichem valley near Deilingen in the Tuttlingen district. It is part of the Großer Heuberg.

Mountains and hills of the Swabian Jura